Santa Margarita Catholic High School (SMCHS) is a coeducational college preparatory Roman Catholic high school located in Rancho Santa Margarita, California, United States.  SMCHS is owned and operated by the Diocese of Orange, and was opened in 1987 under the direction of the Bishop of Orange. Although it follows the Catholic tradition, admission  is open to  students of all  faiths.  As of fall 2018,  1,673 students were enrolled in grades 9 through 12.

SMCHS opened in the fall of 1987, the first Catholic high school to serve South Orange County. Its  campus is adjacent to the San Francisco Solano parish church. Accredited by the Western Association of Schools and Colleges, Santa Margarita is one of three International Baccalaureate World Schools in California, in addition to offering Advanced Placement (AP) courses and exams. SMCHS also offers a comprehensive Auxiliary Studies Program (ASP) to help students who learn differently than others. The Class of 2015 earned $30 million in scholarship offers.

Campus
Groundbreaking for the school was held on April 18, 1986.  It opened with 216 students on September 2, 1987.  The three-story "G" building was completed in 1990.

The Eagle Athletic Center opened in May 2010. The center is the first LEED-certified building in the Diocese of Orange and in Rancho Santa Margarita. In August 2011 the school opened its new $10.3 million 2-story, LEED-certified academic building, that houses a permanent 3,700 square foot television studio, new counseling offices and ASP classrooms, and a second story completely devoted to World Language classrooms. A "Talon Theatre" replaced the "Eagle Dome" that is currently used for talent productions.

Admissions
Admission to Santa Margarita Catholic High School is based on Academic transcripts, activities, and the High School placement test.  The results of the exam are used to help place students in the most appropriate classes for their freshman year. The admissions process includes: the application process, review of academic transcripts, review of standardized testing results, recommendation letters from the students' Math teacher, English Teacher, and Principal/School Counselor, and participation in activities. Prospective Students are encouraged to shadow a current SMCHS student. Incoming freshman students spend the day at Santa Margarita with a current SMCHS freshman with similar interests.

Scholarships

Curriculum
A variety of courses is offered to students, which gives each student the opportunity to take courses fit to his/her individual strengths. SMCHS offers numerous Honors courses, Advanced Placement courses, an International Baccalaureate program, an Interdisciplinary Triad Program, and an Auxiliary Studies Program for students with mild learning differences. Along with this curriculum, SMCHS also offers a Model United Nations (MUN)  program as part of the Honors History department and an Arts and Dance program that encompasses various branches of the performing arts and art classes.

The spiritual aspect of Santa Margarita is developed within students through religious education classes, school wide masses, and various retreats throughout the year. The retreat experience culminates with Kairos, a retreat specifically for seniors. Each student also works to fulfill Christian Service projects each year which are undertaken in the students' religion classes.

SMCHS's graduation requirements prepares students to be involved citizens of the world. Students must accrue a minimum of 270 credits of course work to graduate from SMCHS. Included within credits completed satisfactorily are the following course requirements:

Students are expected to meet all Christian Service obligations before graduation. SMCHS provides students with the opportunity to be involved with different Campus Ministry activities.  There are grade level retreats and campus retreats, Kairos, Peer Ministry, and several school wide masses throughout the year.

Extracurricular activities
SMCHS has several extra-curricular activities on campus. These activities include ASB/Student Council, Color Guard, Drama Productions, Mock Trial, and Pep Squad.

Co-curricular activities: Choir, Dance Team, Debate and Argument, Band (Eagle Regiment), Eagle Television (ETV Public Address Morning Announcements), Journalism (The Eagle Eye Newspaper), Model United Nations, Mock Trial, Orchestra, and Yearbook.

Clubs
SMCHS has a variety of Clubs and Service Organizations. Some of which include:

SMCHS Flying and Aviation Club
FRC Robotics Team

Athletics
Santa Margarita Catholic High School's athletic teams, known as the Eagles, compete in the Trinity League. SMCHS also offers club sports including ice hockey and equestrian. Since 1991, the Eagles have captured 187 league titles, 56 CIF titles, four Southern California Regional titles and 8  State Champion titles. In addition to those team successes, SMCHS has produced over 51 individual CIF Champions and over 38 CIF Players of the Year. has produced many distinguished athletes such as NBA All-Star Klay Thompson, Heisman Trophy winner Carson Palmer, Olympic gold medalist and winner of the 2015 FIFA Women's World Cup Amy Rodriguez, Outland Trophy recipient Kris Farris, Buffalo Sabres first-round draft pick Ryan Johnson, and recipient of the Walter Payton Award and Atlanta Falcons wide receiver Brian Finneran.

SMCHS participates in 15 sports: football, volleyball, basketball, soccer, water polo, cross country, golf, tennis, wrestling, baseball, softball, lacrosse, ice hockey, track and field, and swimming.

Notable alumni

 Michael Brady - MLB player for the Oakland Athletics
 Griffin Canning - Pitcher for  the Los Angeles Angels
 Kristin Cavallari - actress and designer, before transferring to Laguna Beach High School
 River Cracraft - National Football League wide receiver for Miami Dolphins
 K.J. Costello - football player
 Kelly Crean - actress
 Ryan Eggold - actor, who starred in 90210, The Blacklist and New Amsterdam
 Gavin Escobar - National Football League tight end for Kansas City Chiefs, Dallas Cowboys
 Kris Farris - football player
 Erika Figge - member of United States women's national water polo team, 2007 Pan American Games gold medalist
 Brian Finneran - former National Football League wide receiver for Atlanta Falcons
 Beau Hossler - professional golfer; as amateur finished 29th at 2012 U.S. Open
 Michael Hoyos - Argentine soccer player
 Jared Hughes - MLB pitcher for Milwaukee Brewers, Pittsburgh Pirates
 Ethan Luck - drummer for Relient K and for guitarist for O.C. Supertones
 Katie McLaughlin - USA National Team and Olympic Swimmer
 Anicka Delgado - Olympic Swimmer
 Jeremy McNichols - NFL running back for the San Francisco 49ers
 Carson Palmer - Former three-time Pro Bowl quarterback who played for the NFL's Arizona Cardinals, Cincinnati Bengals, and Oakland Raiders,  2002 Heisman Trophy winner
 Doug Reinhardt - MLB baseball player and television personality
 Mark Restelli - Canadian Football League linebacker for Edmonton Eskimos
 Chris Rix - starting quarterback for Florida State Seminoles (2001–2004), now broadcaster for Fox Sports
 Amy Rodriguez - member of United States women's national soccer team, 2008 Summer Olympics gold medalist
 Jason Stiles - football player
 Klay Thompson - 11th overall pick in 2011 NBA Draft, currently plays for the Golden State Warriors
 Mychel Thompson - former NBA player for Cleveland Cavaliers
 Trayce Thompson - MLB player for the Los Angeles Dodgers
 Max Tuerk - USC and NFL center
Ryan Johnson - Buffalo Sabres (NHL) first-round draft pick

References

External links
 School Website

Roman Catholic Diocese of Orange
Catholic secondary schools in California
High schools in Orange County, California
International Baccalaureate schools in California
Educational institutions established in 1987
1987 establishments in California